The Auctioneers Act 1845 (citation 8 & 9 Vict., c.15) was an Act to the Parliament of the United Kingdom, passed during the reign of Queen Victoria on 8 August 1845, with the long title "An Act to impose a new duty on the licence to be taken out by all auctioneers in the United Kingdom".

The initial Act instituted a tax on licenses for auctioneers to raise capital. This was repealed, however, by the Finance Act 1949.

Only one section of the Act remains in British law - Section 7, which states that auctioneers must place a board with their full name and residence that is "publicly visible and legible" in the room where the auction takes place before, during and after the auction. This was to allow people to make formal complaints against auctioneers in cases of fraud or other offenses. This section was expanded by the Auctions (Bidding Agreements) Act 1927, to impose a penalty of 20 pounds sterling upon any auctioneer who failed to follow the Act.

References

External links

United Kingdom Acts of Parliament 1845
Legal history of the United Kingdom
Auction case law